The 2004–05 Football League (known as the Coca-Cola Football League for sponsorship reasons) was the 106th completed season of The Football League.

2004–05 was the first season of the rebranded Football League, with the First, Second and Third Divisions becoming the Football League Championship, Football League One and Football League Two respectively. Coca-Cola replaced the Nationwide Building Society as title sponsor.

Wigan Athletic were promoted to the Premier League as Championship runners-up. They had only been elected to the Football League in 1978, had been the league's fourth-lowest placed club in the 1993–94 season, and before 2003 had never reached the second tier of English football.

Nottingham Forest were relegated from the Championship to League One, becoming the first former European Cup winners to be relegated to the third tier of their domestic league – having won two straight European Cups a quarter of a century earlier. Only ten seasons previously, in 1994–95, they had finished third in the Premier League, and had reached the quarter-finals of the UEFA Cup the following season.

Events
3 December 2004 – League One side Wrexham enters financial administration. Under new Football League rules, the club is penalised 10 league points, placing the club in relegation danger.
21 January 2005 – Former Chelsea chairman Ken Bates finalises a deal to buy a controlling interest in the debt-riddled Championship club Leeds United.
2 April 2005 – Stockport County become the first League team this season to be relegated.
29 April 2005 – League Two side Cambridge United enters financial administration, six days after being formally relegated from the Football League.
7 June 2005 – George Burley resigns as manager of Derby County, citing differences with the club’s board.
24 June 2005 – Former Bolton Wanderers assistant manager Phil Brown becomes Derby County’s fifth manager in four years.

Final league tables and results

The tables below are reproduced here in the exact form that they can be found at The Rec.Sport.Soccer Statistics Foundation website, with home and away statistics separated. Play-off results are from the same website.

Championship

Play-offs

Topscorers

League One

Play-offs

Topscorers

League Two

Play-offs

Topscorers

See also
2004–05 in English football
2004 in association football
2005 in association football

References

External links
 Football League Tables

 

 
2004